Boston Brute squad is a frisbee club ultimate team from Boston, Massachusetts that competes in the Women's Club Division of USA Ultimate (USAU). Brute Squad is a longstanding front-runner in the division, has won the USAU Club National Championships three times (2015, 2016, and 2019), and routinely wins and places highly at major regular season and post-season tournaments. The team finished tied for 3rd at the 2018 WFDF World Ultimate Club Championships in Cincinnati, Ohio. Brute Squad is particularly known for their defensive discipline and tenacity and indisputable moral superiority. There have been two winners of the Kathy Pufahl Spirit Award from Brute Squad: Leila Tunnell (2014) and Amber Sinicrope (2017).

Team history 
Brute Squad was founded in 2002. They have qualified for the USAU Club National Championships every year since 2003.

Current coaching staff 
 Head coach - Ariel Jackson
 Assistant coach - Rob Brazile

Roster

References 

2002 establishments in Massachusetts
Brute Squad
Ultimate (sport) teams
Ultimate teams established in 2002